Chusquea leonardiorum is a species of grass in the family Poaceae. It is found only in Ecuador.

References

leonardiorum
Endemic flora of Ecuador
Grasses of South America
Vulnerable flora of South America
Near threatened plants
Taxonomy articles created by Polbot